Dongotono is an ethnic group of South Sudan. They live around the Dongotono Mountains in Eastern Equatoria State of South Sudan . Their main towns are Isoke Payam (mission), Isoke and Ikotos. They speak a variety of the Nilotic Lotuko language, specifically Dongotono. Many of them are Catholic. Their population is over 120,000.

References

Ethnic groups in South Sudan